Limnoscelidae is a family of carnivorous diadectomorphs. They would have been the largest terrestrial carnivores of their day, the other large carnivores being aquatic or semi aquatic labyrinthodont amphibians. The Limnoscelidae themselves, being close to the ancestry of amniotes, would have been well adapted land animals, but still dependent on anamniote eggs, and possibly having a tadpole stage. Contrary to the more advanced herbivorous diadectids, the teeth retained labyrinthodont infolding of the enamel, and were pointed and slightly recurved at the tip.

Taxonomy
Two species assigned to the only genus of the family.

 Limnoscelis (two species) is the nominal genus for which the family was erected. Both species were quite large animals, capable of reaching 1.5 meters as adults.

Former Members 

 Limnostygis (one species) was once considered to be a member of the Limnoscelidae by Robert L. Carroll, but as of a recent study it is no longer considered to be a member based on a lack of data. It is known from a single partial skeleton. It was markedly smaller than Limnoscelis, about 40 cm in adult length.

References

Diadectomorphs
Pennsylvanian first appearances
Carboniferous tetrapods
Permian tetrapods
Cisuralian extinctions